A drainage ditch is a depression in the land created to channel water. Drainage ditches are typically formed around low-lying areas, roadsides or fields proximate to a water body or created to channel water from a more distant water source for the purpose of plant irrigation. The two stage drainage ditch is classified as a 'surface' sustainable drainage system, contrary to a sub-surface system. The two stage drainage ditch is a modification of the land whereby grass benches which serve as floodplains are formed within the land of the watershed of the water system, shown in the diagram to the right. By implementing benches either side of the water body, the energy of surface runoff dissipates, sustaining fluvial processes of the channel, thereby improving the water stability and water quality of existing channel.



The Environmental Issues 
Inadequate drainage ditches and water management systems accelerate processes of water contamination, excessively desiccate soils during drought season and become a perpetuating financial burden to maintain if proactive drainage management systems are not properly exercised. Traditional drainage ditches and systems such as the 'Conventional Ditch' to the right have been beset by issues of perpetuating erosion and instability problems caused by an inability of the existing channel to manage large volumes of water discharge during peak flows. Consequently, this erosion of the surrounding land caused by surface runoff elicits in issues of deteriorating water quality and sedimentation, bank and channel widening, and the degradation of arable land proximate to the water body. Consequently, these issues exacerbate until the water channel becomes impassable and require extensive, costly maintenance.
However, sustainable ditch design implementation, for example, a properly created two stage drainage ditch can alleviate such issues in a self-maintaining manner with minimal impact to the natural geomorphological equilibrium of the wider ecosystem of the particular water body. Converse to  traditional drainage ditches, the two stage drainage ditch is better equipped in managing the speed and filtration of nutrient flow and other contaminants from the surrounding land into the water body, thus, resolving such environmental issues (see below).

Benefits that resolve such Environmental Issues 
In acknowledgement of such environmental issues, the primary purpose of the two stage drainage ditch is to more effectively transport sediment and other contaminants using natural fluvial processes of existing channels with minimal maintenance whilst allowing existent activities on the land proximate to the water body to continue such as farming, irrigation or roadworks. Thus, the overall benefit of the two stage drainage ditch is the stability of the water channel and wider ecosystem, reduced rates of discharge during high flows and reduced sediment entering the water system, aiding in alleviating much of the environmental issues suffered in existing water channels.  Concurrently, the two stage drainage ditch requires little to no maintenance due to it being a natural geomorphological management strategy that does not upset the equilibrium that a conventional strategy such as entrenchment would cause. Furthermore, much of the vegetation, except for the land needed to implement the adjacent grass benches (see disadvantage analysis below) and the natural shape and meander of the water channel remains largely unaltered during the formation of the two stage drainage ditch, thus, protecting the system's ecology and substantially reduces ongoing maintenance costs, contrary to other drainage management systems.

Ecosystem Response - Reduced Eutrophication 
Further, the two stage drainage ditch approach also improves water quality through nutrient assimilation by improving the interaction of sediment/soil and water on the adjacent benches above the water body that function similar to floodplains or wetlands. Consequently, sediment and other contaminants are lodged along these linear benches, limiting the leakage effect of such sediment from the surrounding watershed into the water channel itself.

In turn, the reduced level of contaminants (particularly from over-fertilised land) namely, nitrogen and phosphorus reduces the level of eutrophication taking place in the water. The limited level of eutrophication within the water decreases the level of algal blooms and growth of duckweed that create anoxic conditions in the water system. This elicits in a loss of biodiversity in aquatic life and hampering the agricultural functionality of the ditches.

Advantages and Disadvantages of the Two Stage Drainage Ditch

Optimal Location 
The optimal region to establish a two stage drainage ditch is where there are benches already naturally forming for binary reasons. Firstly, there is a supply of fine sediment available and accessible at the bottom of the channel, thus, eliminating the cost associated with excavating and moving sediment to artificially manufacture the benches in a watershed with minimal natural bench formation. Secondly, a significant part of the water flow entering the channel comes in the form of sub-surface drainage which contains very little sediment so this flow picks up sediment once inside the ditch with minimal natural bench formation. Thus, for reasons of sedimentation and cost-saving in the form of land excavation and sediment transportation, it is more beneficial to impose a two stage drainage ditch in a location where benches are already naturally forming.

Case Study: South East Minnesota

The Minnesota Issue 
The issue faced by Minnesota's channel management systems concerns the implementation of traditional ditch systems that were used to straighten what were once headwaters streams, disrupting the fluvial processes of the hydrological system. In fact, more than 25,000 miles of these traditional drainage ditch lines exist along agricultural fields in Minnesota, particularly in the South East in parts of the Upper Mississippi River. The Nature Conservancy's investigation into the Minnesota region affirmed the above limitations of traditional drainage management above,

finding that these deep and wide conventional ditches are highly susceptible to erosion and sedimentation, hindering the stability of the ditch, finding excessive levels of nitrogen and phosphorus in streams which culminate in eutrophication, in addition to increased flooding. Biske affirmed Hansen's view that once such ditches are channelised and constructed, attempting to return the channels to their natural fluvial processes and meandering nature results in exacerbated erosion and sediment deposition.

The Solution: Two Stage Drainage Ditch 
Therefore, to restore and alleviate issues of water quality, given agriculture is the largest income generator of Minnesota, the Nature Conservancy have begun to test a value analysis associated with the formation of two stage drainage systems in the region in the past decade. In 2010, a 7,000 linear feet two stage drainage ditch known as the 'Adams Birr' was implemented (see Figures to right).

From the daily results taken, testing for nitrate concentration in the channel, preliminary data demonstrated how, whilst there was insufficient data as at 2010 to report the full environmental benefits of the imposed two stage drainage ditch, there was a minimal reduction in daily nitrate levels intake, measured against the total daily precipitation intake. A longer time horizon of data would further demonstrate the positive impact the two stage drainage ditch has on nitrate levels in the channel during periods

of precipitation.

Ultimately, as at the time the report was published, it was too soon to represent the nutrient attenuation benefits of the program. However, initial visual observations demonstrated habitat improvements and aquatic life improvements from the initial results of the nitrate reduction were already beginning to take place, as the process of eutrophication in the water channel began to slow.

References 

Drainage